Turritriton kobelti is a species of predatory sea snail, a marine gastropod mollusk in the family Cymatiidae.

This species is a possible synonym or subspecies of Turritriton gibbosus. Only genetic investigation can tell.

Description
The shell size varies between 14 mm and 42 mm

Distribution
This species is found in European waters and in the Atlantic Ocean off Angola, Gabon, Cape Verde, Ghana and Senegal.

References

 Bernard, P.A. (Ed.) (1984). Coquillages du Gabon [Shells of Gabon]. Pierre A. Bernard: Libreville, Gabon. 140, 75 plates

External links
 
 Maltzan, H. F. von. (1884). Diagnosen neuer Senegambischer Gastropoden. Nachrichtsblatt der Deutschen. Malakozooologischen Gesellschaft 16: 65-73

Cymatiidae
Gastropods described in 1884
Molluscs of the Atlantic Ocean
Molluscs of Angola
Gastropods of Cape Verde
Invertebrates of West Africa